Vladimir Ignjatijević (born May 6, 1941) is a Yugoslav sprint canoer who competed in the mid-1960s. He finished eighth in the K-4 1000 m event at the 1964 Summer Olympics in Tokyo.

References
 Sports-reference.com profile

1941 births
Canoeists at the 1964 Summer Olympics
Living people
Olympic canoeists of Yugoslavia
Yugoslav male canoeists
Place of birth missing (living people)